Cytochrome f is the largest subunit of cytochrome b6f complex (plastoquinol—plastocyanin reductase). In its structure and functions, the cytochrome b6f complex bears extensive analogy to the cytochrome bc1 complex of mitochondria and photosynthetic purple bacteria. Cytochrome f (cyt f) plays a role analogous to that of cytochrome c1, in spite of their different structures.

The 3D structure of Brassica rapa (Turnip) cyt f has been determined. The lumen-side segment of cyt f includes two structural domains: a small one above a larger one that, in turn, is on top of the attachment to the membrane domain. The large domain consists of an anti-parallel beta-sandwich and a short haem-binding peptide, which form a three-layer structure. The small domain is inserted between beta-strands F and G of the large domain and is an all-beta domain. The haem nestles between two short helices at the N terminus of cyt f. Within the second helix is the sequence motif for the c-type cytochromes, CxxCH (residues 21–25), which is covalently attached to the haem through thioether bonds to Cys-21 and Cys-24. His-25 is the fifth haem iron ligand. The sixth haem iron ligand is the alpha-amino group of Tyr-1 in the first helix. Cyt f has an internal network of water molecules that may function as a proton wire. The water chain appears to be a conserved feature of cyt f.

References

Further reading

External links
 

Photosynthesis
Cytochromes
Peripheral membrane proteins